Milltown is a suburb on the southside of Dublin, Ireland.  Milltown was the site of several working mills on the River Dodder and is also the location of the meeting of the River Slang with the Dodder. It is located adjacent to other suburban areas such as Windy Arbour, Ranelagh, Dartry, Clonskeagh, and Donnybrook.

History 
The townland got its name well before the 18th century. Both Milltown and Clonskeagh were liberties of Dublin, following the English invasion and colonisation in 1290.

Mill
A mill race was taken from just above the weir located 100m downstream from the 'Nine Arches' viaduct. It ran beside what is now the Islamic Centre towards the mill which was located in what is now Dodder Park. The remnants of this mill can still be seen.

Transport
Milltown is marked by a spectacular 19th-century railway bridge across the river, which was part of the Harcourt Street railway line which ran from Harcourt Street to Bray. On 30 June 2004, the bridge was re-opened for the Luas light rail system which runs from St. Stephen's Green to Bride's Glen. This bridge, and sometimes the area immediately surrounding it, became known informally as the 'Nine Arches'. Milltown railway station opened on 1 May 1860 and finally closed on 31 December 1958.

Sport
The area is still associated with football club Shamrock Rovers, who played there at Glenmalure Park on land leased from the Jesuits, from 1926 until 1987 when it was controversially sold to developers.
Milltown Golf Club celebrated its centenary in 2007.

Administrative area 
Milltown is located along the River Dodder, which in this area, marks the boundary between the two council areas of Dublin City Council and Dun Laoghaire Rathdown County Council. Milltown lies in both, with the village falling within Dublin City.

Education
Alexandra College, a Church of Ireland girls' school, is located in Milltown, as is the Ahlul Bayt Islamic Centre, the only Shia mosque in Ireland.

The Jesuits have a long presence at Milltown with a secondary school for boys, Gonzaga College on its lands at Milltown Park. The Jesuit Training College evolved into the Milltown Institute of Theology and Philosophy a recognised college of the National University of Ireland. The National College of Industrial Relations was also founded by Jesuits on its lands in Milltown, which eventually moved to the IFSC becoming the National College of Ireland.

The Franciscan Brothers of the Third Order Regular, noted for their having secretly taught the boys of the Catholic population for decades in underground schools, had formed a monastery and school here, after the relaxation of the Penal Laws which had forbidden Catholic education. In 1818 they transferred their monastery to Mountbellew in County Galway.

Mount St. Mary's was formerly the seminary of the Marist Fathers.

See also
 List of towns and villages in Ireland
 Old Moore's Almanac, an almanac which has been published since 1764 by Theophilus Moore, who ran a classical academy at Milltown

References

 
Towns and villages in Dublin (city)
Uppercross